PA34 may refer to:
 Pennsylvania Route 34
 Pennsylvania's 34th congressional district
 Piper PA-34 Seneca, a light aircraft first produced in 1971
 Pitcairn PA-34, an autogyro of the 1930s